Sapyga quinquepunctata is a species of sapygid wasp. It is a parasite of mason bees.

References 

Sapygidae
Parasitic wasps
Insects described in 1781